The Mercedes-Benz M19 engine is a naturally-aspirated, 3.8-liter, straight-8 engine, designed, developed and produced by Mercedes-Benz; between 1932 and 1933.

Applications
Mercedes-Benz 380 S (W10)
Mercedes-Benz 380 S (W19)

References

Mercedes-Benz engines
Straight-eight engines
Engines by model
Gasoline engines by model